Catherine Jeanne Cesarsky (born Catherine Jeanne Gattegno on 24 February 1943) is an Argentine and French astronomer, known for her successful research activities in several central areas of modern astrophysics. She was formerly president of the International Astronomical Union (2006-2009) and the director general of the European Southern Observatory (1999–2007). In 2017 she became Chairman of the Board of the Square Kilometre Array radio telescope project.

Education
Born in France, Catherine Cesarsky was largely raised in Argentina and she received a degree in physical sciences at the University of Buenos Aires. She graduated with a PhD in astronomy in 1971 from Harvard University (Cambridge, Mass., USA). Her thesis focused on the propagation of cosmic rays in the galaxy and was advised by physicist Russell Kulsrud.

Career
After obtaining her PhD, Dr. Cesarsky was awarded a postdoctoral research fellowship at the California Institute of Technology for three years, where she worked with Peter Goldreich.
In 1974, she moved to France, becoming a staff member of the Service d'Astrophysique, Direction des Sciences de la Matière, Commissariat à l'Energie Atomique, and she established her further career in France. From 1985 to 1993, she was the head of the Service d'Astrophysique. Later, as Director of Direction des Sciences de la Matière from 1994 to 1999, she led about 3000 scientists, engineers and technicians active within a broad spectrum of basic research programmes in physics, chemistry, astrophysics and earth sciences. From 1999 to 2007, she was the Director General of the European Southern Observatory; she was thus responsible for the end of construction of the Very Large Telescope (VLT) and its instruments and for the operations, for the conclusion of the agreements and the first part of the construction of Atacama Large Millimeter Array (ALMA), and she launched the studies for the European Extremely Large Telescope. At present, she is the High Commissioner for Atomic Energy in France, advisor to the French government for science and energy issues. She chairs the Science Program Committee of the French space agency, Centre National d’Etudes Spatiales, and the Consultative Committee European Atomic Energy Community - Fusion.
From August 2006 to August 2009, she was President of the International Astronomical Union. She is recipient of the 1998 COSPAR (Committee on Space Research) Space Science Award, member or Foreign member of various Academies (French Académie des Sciences, Academia Europaea, International Academy of Astronautics, National Academy of Sciences USA, Royal Swedish Academy of Sciences, Royal Society of London), and Doctor Honoris Causa from the Geneva University. Catherine Cesarsky is Commandeur de l’Ordre national du Mérite and Commandeur de l’Ordre de la Légion d’honneur.

Research
Dr. Cesarsky is known for her research activities in several central areas of modern astrophysics. The first part of her career was devoted to the high-energy domain. This has involved studies of the propagation and composition of galactic cosmic rays, of matter and fields in the diffuse interstellar medium, as well as the acceleration of particles in astrophysical shocks, e.g. in connection with supernovae.
She then turned to infrared astronomy. She was the principal investigator of the camera on board the Infrared Space Observatory of the European Space Agency, which flew between 1995 and 1998. As such, she has led the central programme, which studied the infrared emission from a variety of galactic and extragalactic sources and yielded new and exciting results on star formation and galactic evolution. These were consolidated through further observations with the ESO VLT, the satellites Spitzer and now Herschel.

Awards and distinctions

 Recipient of the 1998 Committee on Space Research Space Sciences Award.
 Chevalier de l'Ordre National du Mérite (1989)
 Officier de l'Ordre national du Mérite (1999).
 Officier de la Légion d'Honneur (2004).
 Commandeur de l'Ordre national du Mérite (2008)
 Chevalier / Commandeur / Grand Officier de la Légion d'Honneur (1994 / 2011 / 2018)
 Member of the French Academy of Sciences (2007)
 Member of the Academia Europaea
 Member of the International Academy of Astronautics
 Foreign Associate of the National Academy of Sciences of the United States of America (2005)
 Foreign Member of the Royal Swedish Academy of Sciences
 Foreign Member of the Royal Society of London (2005)
 Prix Jules Janssen of the Société astronomique de France (French Astronomical Society) (2009)
 2010 Doctorate Honoris Causa University of Geneva
2020 Tate medal assigned by American Institute of Physics every two years to non-US citizens for their leadership

See also
List of women in leadership positions on astronomical instrumentation projects

References

External links

About Catherine J. Cesarsky

1943 births
Living people
Foreign Members of the Royal Society
20th-century French astronomers
Harvard Graduate School of Arts and Sciences alumni
Members of Academia Europaea
Members of the French Academy of Sciences
Members of the Royal Swedish Academy of Sciences
Foreign associates of the National Academy of Sciences
Officiers of the Légion d'honneur
Women astronomers
Planetary scientists
Women planetary scientists
21st-century French astronomers
Presidents of the International Astronomical Union